Vijayanarayanam is a community in South India. It has 11564 inhabitants according to the 2001 census. It is located in southern part of Tamil Nadu, And it is comes under Tirunelveli District. It gets name from Narayana. 

There is a large pond in this village. Migratory birds, from different countries comes here for migration during seasons.

References

Cities and towns in Tirunelveli district
Communication towers in India